The Human Romance is the seventh studio album by the American melodic death metal band Darkest Hour. The album was released on February 22, 2011, in North America through eOne Music, and was released on March 7 in Europe through Century Media Records. This would be Darkest Hour's last album with drummer Ryan Parrish and bassist Paul Burnette.

Production

The Human Romance was recorded at a North Carolina studio with producer (and Soilwork guitarist) Peter Wichers.
Wichers previously helmed such acclaimed albums as All That Remains's The Fall of Ideals and Soilwork's latest effort, The Panic Broadcast.
This time around, the Darkest Hour songs were composed a bit differently than was the case in the past. Guitarist Mike Schleibaum explains, "We have been working on these tunes ever since we left the studio last April.
'The Eternal Return' was written during a very dark, bleak time for the band and I think that record matches that in both tone and character. Our vision was for it to be an in-your-face, no-frills aggressive assault. The new material shares in that aggression and pushes Darkest Hour beyond the unknown."

Promotion and release

To promote the album, several songs were available for previewing online prior to the release of The Human Romance. These included the release of "Savor the Kill" in January, and "Your Everyday Disaster" and "Love as a Weapon" in February 2011. The entire album became available for streaming on the band's Myspace page on February 15, 2011.

Track listing

Personnel
The Human Romance album personnel as adapted from Allmusic.,

Darkest Hour
 John Henry – vocals
Mike Schleibaum – rhythm guitar
 Michael "Lonestar" Carrigan – lead guitar
 Paul Burnette – bass
 Ryan Parrish - drums

Additional musicians
 Tosin Abasi (Animals as Leaders) – guitar solo on Terra Solaris
 Chris Carmichael – strings
 Kristen Randall (ex-Winds of Plague) – piano

Recording and production
 Ryan Smith – mastering
 Paul Leavitt – mixing
 Mike McAree – engineer
 Brian McTernan – mixing
 Mike Schleibaum – engineer
 Peter Wichers – producer

Artwork
 Paul Grosso – creative director
 Andrew Kelley – art direction, design
 Tom Medvedich – photography

References

External links
Darkest Hour on Myspace

Darkest Hour (band) albums
2011 albums
E1 Music albums
Albums produced by Brian McTernan